Charles R. Davis (July 12, 1945 – December 23, 2004) was an American politician and educator.

Davis lived in Princeton, Minnesota. He received his bachelor's degree in agriculture education from University of Minnesota, in 1968, and his master's degree in education from University of Minnesota, in 1972. Davis taught vocational education at Princeton High School in Princeton, Minnesota and was also a farmer. He also lived in Milaca, Minnesota. Davis served in the Minnesota Senate from 1981 to 1982 and was a Democrat. He died from an automobile accident.

References

1945 births
2004 deaths
People from Milaca, Minnesota
People from Princeton, Minnesota
University of Minnesota alumni
Farmers from Minnesota
Schoolteachers from Minnesota
Democratic Party Minnesota state senators
Road incident deaths in Minnesota